The 1985 Indianapolis Colts season was the 33rd season for the team in the National Football League (NFL) and second in Indianapolis. The Colts finished the year with a record of 5 wins and 11 losses, and fourth in the AFC East division. The Colts did improve on their 4–12 record from 1984, but missed the playoffs for the 8th straight season. This season was rather sluggish, as the Colts for most of the season alternated wins and losses. After starting out mediocre at 3–5, the Colts would then lose 6 straight to sit at 3-11 before winning their last 2 games to finish 5–11. This would be the only full season for head coach Rod Dowhower, as he was fired 13 games into the following season.

Offseason

Draft

Personnel

Staff

Roster

Regular season

Schedule

Standings

References

See also 
History of the Indianapolis Colts
Indianapolis Colts seasons
Colts–Patriots rivalry

Indianapolis Colts
Indianapolis Colts seasons
Indianapolis Colts